Live from Paris is the fourth live album by Colombian singer and songwriter Shakira. It was filmed at the Palais Omnisports de Paris-Bercy concert hall in Paris, France, where Shakira performed on 13 and 14 June 2011, as part of the European leg of The Sun Comes Out World Tour. Live from Paris was released in a DVD and live audio CD format, a standard DVD format, and as a Blu-ray Disc edition. It was released in most countries on 2 December 2011, while in the United States it was released on 5 December. Prior to its release, Live from Paris was screened in various cinemas across the world and was also promoted through Shakira's official website, which posted numerous trailers and previews of the album. Shakira's rendition of French singer-songwriter Francis Cabrel's song "Je L'Aime à Mourir", which she specifically performed during the concert shows at Paris, was released as a single on 29 November 2011.

Upon its release, Live from Paris received generally favourable reviews from critics, who praised it as a showcase of Shakira's versatility. One reviewer, however, criticised the singer for putting less emphasis on vocals and more on the dance routines. Commercially, the album performed well on the charts of France and Mexico, where it was later certified platinum by the Syndicat National de l'Édition Phonographique (SNEP) and Asociación Mexicana de Productores de Fonogramas y Videogramas (AMPROFON), respectively. In the United States, En Vivo Desde Paris peaked at number two on the Billboard Top Latin Albums chart, and at number one on the Latin Pop Albums chart.

Background and release 

After the tickets of the European leg of The Sun Comes Out World Tour, which was launched to promote Shakira's eighth studio album She Wolf (2009) and ninth studio album Sale el Sol (2010), were sold-out, she extended the tour into 2011 and announced a show to be held at the Palais Omnisports de Paris-Bercy in Paris, France, on 14 June. Later, Shakira decided to add another date to the Paris show of the tour and chose 13 June to perform at the same venue. The performances held on these two dates were filmed for inclusion in a live album. It was made available in three formats: an exclusive edition which includes a DVD and live audio CD, a standard DVD edition, and a Blu-ray Disc edition. The formats included the full performances of 22 songs, along with behind-the-scenes documentary footage of the shows. The recording was also screened in select cinemas in countries like Belgium, Brazil, Holland, Italy, Mexico, Portugal and Spain, in Dolby Surround sound. Shakira's official website also posted various trailers of the DVD and previews of some performances, such as that of "Whenever, Wherever", for additional promotion. The live album, consisting of the DVD and live audio CD, was released as Live from Paris and En Vivo Desde París on 2 December 2011, in most countries worldwide. In the United States, it was released on 5 December 2011. It was released in DVD and Blu-ray disc formats the following day.

"Je L'Aime à Mourir", Shakira's rendition of the original song by French singer-songwriter Francis Cabrel, was specifically added to the setlist of the tour for the concerts held in Paris. A studio recording of Shakira's version of the song was released as a single on 29 November 2011. The song peaked at number one on the singles chart of the French-speaking Wallonia region of Belgium and France, where it was later certified gold by the Belgian Entertainment Association (BEA) and Syndicat National de l'Édition Phonographique (SNEP), respectively.

Reception

Critical reaction 

Live from Paris received generally favourable reviews from critics. Carlos Quintana from About.com gave the DVD a very positive review and praised the selection of songs, saying they were reflective of Shakira's "evolution as an artist", and also commended her talent and performance, writing, "Besides her sensual dancing, unique voice and great energy, you can tell from the images on the DVD she is a very professional artist who takes her job very seriously". He concluded by calling the audio CD of Live from Paris a "compilation [that] covers in a good way her musical spectrum" and the DVD "fantastic" due to "the high quality of the sound and the video"; he also commented that the live album "offers a good overview of Shakira's musical career". Stephen Thomas Erlewine from AllMusic complimented the energy of the audio CD and Shakira's versatility, commenting she "leans heavily on glitzy electro-dance crossovers but finds room for quieter moments, whether it’s a stripped-down cover of Metallica's "Nothing Else Matters" or her own "Gypsy", keeping the momentum running throughout a lengthy set, then bringing down the house with "Waka Waka". He, however, found the video versions much more impressive, opining that they "give a greater indication of the size of the spectacle" and "emphasize Shakira's intense charisma". Adam Markovitz from Entertainment Weekly gave the live album a mixed review; he praised the visual show Shakira put up, but was critical of her vocals, saying "she writhes and dry-humps through her catalog like the world's highest-paid strip-aerobics instructor, showing off plenty of skin — but sadly, not much musicianship". He also felt that Shakira's performance was too sexual, commenting that she "sometimes comes off more stripper than superstar". The album was nominated "Best Live DVD" at the 2012 Premios Shock awards ceremony,

Commercial performance 
On the chart date of 10 December 2011, Live from Paris entered the French Albums Chart at number 32, and later peaked at number eight for two weeks. It spent a total of 35 weeks on the chart. It became Shakira's first live album to chart in the country. In 2011, the Syndicat National de l'Édition Phonographique certified the DVD platinum for sales of 15,000 units, and in 2012, the live album was certified platinum for sales of 100,000 units. Live from Paris entered the Mexican Albums Chart at number 13 and peaked at number four. It was a commercial success in the region and was later certified platinum and gold by the Asociación Mexicana de Productores de Fonogramas y Videogramas (AMPROFON) for shipments of 90,000 units.

In the United States, En Vivo Desde Paris performed well on the Latin record charts. It peaked at number two on the US Billboard Top Latin Albums chart and stayed on the chart for a total of 17 weeks. It peaked at number one on the Latin Pop Albums chart, and stayed on the chart for a total of 16 weeks. It became Shakira's first live album to peak atop the chart since MTV Unplugged (2000).

Track listing 
 On the Spanish version of the album, the album title and bonus features are listed in Spanish. The titles of the songs stay the same in all of the releases.

Personnel 
Credits adapted from AllMusic.

Promoter - Live Nation
Live Nation SVP of Touring - Jorge "Pepo" Ferradas
Live Nation Tour Director - John Sanders
Director - Nick Wickham
Production Supervisor - Jake Berry
Tour Accountant - Dan McGee
Production Co-ordinator - Ali Vatter
Management - Nexus Management Group
Road Manager - Rome Reddick
Head Rigger - Russell Glen
Rigger - Bjorn Melchert
Head Carpenter - Pat Boyd
Show Director - Felix Barrett
Tour Camera Operations - Redo Jackson, Joe Walohan
Cameras Supervisor - Brett Turnbull
Camera Operations - Adam Gohil, Julian Harries, Matt Ingham, Alistair Miller, Lotte Ockeloen, Harriet Sheard, Niels Van Brakel, Tim Van Der Voort, Alan Wells, Nick Wheeler, Shaun Willis
Projectionist - David Cruz
Wardrobe Supervisor - Louise Kennedy
Choreographer - Maite Marcos
Tour Photographer - Xavi Menos
Tour Assistant - Brad Kline
Music Supervisor - Magnus Fiennes
Musical Production - Shakira, Tim Mitchell
Show Programmer - Freddy Pinero
Audio Crew Chief - Simon Bauer

Audio Monitor Technician - Chris King
Audio Technicians - William Fisher, Dustin Lewis
Monitor Engineer - Ed Dragoules
Key Follow Spot Operator - Linford Hudson
Carpenters - Eric Duheaney, Brittany Kiefer
Lighting Director(s) - Fraser Elisha, Daniel O'Brien
Lighting Designer - Paul Normandale
Lighting Technicians - Martin Garnish, Kris Lundberg, Ben Rogerson, Chris Roper
Lighting Crew Chief - Joe Gonzales
Lighting Programmer - John McGarrigle
Spot Lights Technician - Fraser McFarlane
Satge Manager - Shawn Saucier
Floor Manager - Roger Dempster
Set Designer - Es Devlin
Tour Security - Armando Vera
Venue Security - Joaquin Barcia
Artist Personal Security - Antonio Merabak
Production Manager - Bill Leabody
Advance Production Manager - Phay MacMahon
Dressing Rooms - Brad Kline
Front of House Engineer - Michael Keating
Artist Dresser - Louise Kennedy
Wardrobe - Pam Lewis
Makeup - Elaine Kennedy, Lorraine Milligan, Elizabeth Patey

Hair Stylists - Cynthia Alvarez, Luz Marina Gonzalez
Musical Director - Tim Mitchel
Drums - Brendan Buckley
Keys - Albert Menendez
Guitar Technician - Andy Corns, Sean "Stig" Tighe
Guitar(s) - Tim Mitchell, Grecco Buratto
Bass Guitar - Eric Holden
Backing Vocals - Olgui Chirino
Percussion - Thomas "Dyani" Akuru
Violin Technician - Sean "Sting" Tighe
Violin - Una Palliser
Dancers - Dionne Renee, Yanet Fuentes
Shakira's Assistant - Gabriela Diaz
Video Blogs - Xavi Menos
Video Director - Michael Tinsley
Video Engineer - Michael Bischof
Lead LED Technician - Phil Evans
Additional TV Lighting - Phase 4
VIP Sponsorship Co-ordinator - Elizabeth Curto
DVD Technical Facilities - CINEVIDEOGROUP, The Netherlands
Unit Manager - Bolke Burnaby Lautier
CINEVIDEOGROUP Project Co-ordinator - Rogier Kalkhove

Charts

Weekly charts

Year-end charts

Certifications

Album

!scope="row"|Canada (2017)
|
|13,000
|-

DVD

See also
List of number-one Billboard Latin Pop Albums from the 2010s

References

Shakira live albums
Shakira video albums
2011 live albums
2011 video albums
Epic Records live albums
Epic Records video albums
Live video albums
Spanish-language live albums